Mechanicsville is an unincorporated community in St. Charles County, in the U.S. state of Missouri.

History
A post office called Mechanicsville was established in 1871, and remained in operation until 1900. A share of the first settlers being mechanics by trade most likely caused this name to be selected for both post office and town.

References

Unincorporated communities in St. Charles County, Missouri
Unincorporated communities in Missouri